The Enfield poltergeist was a claim of supernatural activity at 284 Green Street, a council house in Brimsdown, Enfield, London, England, United Kingdom, between 1977 and 1979. The alleged poltergeist activity centred around sisters Janet (11) and Margaret Hodgson (13). Some members of the Society for Psychical Research (SPR), such as inventor Maurice Grosse and writer Guy Lyon Playfair, believed the haunting to be genuine, while others such as Anita Gregory and John Beloff were "unconvinced" and found evidence the girls had faked incidents for the benefit of journalists. Members of the Committee for the Scientific Investigation of Claims of the Paranormal (CSICOP), including stage magicians such as Milbourne Christopher and Joe Nickell, criticized paranormal investigators for being credulous whilst also identifying elements of the case as being indicative of a hoax.

The story attracted press coverage in British newspapers, has been mentioned in books, featured in television and radio documentaries, and dramatized in the 2016 horror film The Conjuring 2.

Claims
In August 1977, single parent Peggy Hodgson called the Metropolitan Police to her rented home at 284 Green Street in Enfield, London, claiming she had witnessed furniture moving and that two of her four children had heard knocking sounds on the walls. The children included Margaret (13) and Janet (11). A woman police constable reported witnessing a chair "wobble and slide" but “could not determine the cause of the movement”. Later claims included disembodied voices, loud noises, thrown toys, overturned chairs, and children levitating. 

Over a period of eighteen months, more than thirty people, including the Hodgsons' neighbors, psychic researchers, and journalists, said they variously saw heavy furniture moving of its own accord, objects being thrown across a room and the sisters seeming to levitate several feet off the ground. Many also heard and recorded knocking noises and a gruff voice. The story was regularly covered in the Daily Mirror newspaper until reports came to an end in 1979.

Investigations

Paranormal
Society for Psychical Research (SPR) members Maurice Grosse and Guy Lyon Playfair reported "curious whistling and barking noises coming from Janet's general direction." Although Playfair maintained the haunting was genuine and wrote in his later book This House Is Haunted: The True Story of a Poltergeist (1980) that an "entity" was to blame for the Enfield disturbances, he often doubted the children's veracity and wondered if they were playing tricks and exaggerating. Still, Grosse and Playfair believed that even though some of the alleged poltergeist activity was faked by the girls, other incidents were genuine. Other paranormal investigators who studied the case included American demonologists Ed and Lorraine Warren, who visited the Enfield house in 1978 and were convinced that the events had a supernatural explanation.

Janet was detected in trickery; a video camera in an adjoining room caught her bending spoons and attempting to bend an iron bar. Grosse had observed Janet banging a broom handle on the ceiling and hiding his tape-recorder. According to Playfair, one of Janet's voices she called "Bill" displayed a "habit of suddenly changing the topic—it was a habit Janet also had". When Janet and Margaret admitted "pranking" to journalists, Grosse and Playfair compelled the girls to retract their confession. The two men were mocked by other researchers for being easily duped.

The psychical researcher Renée Haynes had noted that doubts were raised about the alleged poltergeist voice at the SPR conference at Cambridge in 1978, where video cassettes from Enfield were examined. SPR investigator Anita Gregory stated the Enfield case had been "overrated", characterising several episodes of the girls' behaviour as "suspicious" and speculated that the girls had "staged" some incidents for the benefit of journalists seeking a sensational story. John Beloff, a former president of the SPR, investigated and suggested Janet was practicing ventriloquism. Both Beloff and Gregory came to the conclusion that Janet and Margaret were playing tricks on the investigators.

Other
Milbourne Christopher, an American stage magician, briefly investigated the Enfield occurrences and failed to observe anything that could be called paranormal. He was dismayed by what he felt was suspicious activity on the part of Janet, later concluding that "the poltergeist was nothing more than the antics of a little girl who wanted to cause trouble and who was very, very clever." Ventriloquist Ray Alan visited the house and concluded that Janet's male voices were simply vocal tricks.

Skeptical interpretations

Criticisms of investigations
Skeptic Joe Nickell of the Committee for the Scientific Investigation of Claims of the Paranormal (CSICOP) examined the findings of paranormal investigators and criticized them for being overly credulous; when a supposedly disembodied demonic voice was heard, Playfair noted that "as always Janet's lips hardly seemed to be moving." He states that a remote-controlled still camera—the photographer was not present in the room with the girls—timed to take a picture every fifteen seconds was shown by investigator Melvin Harris to reveal "pranking" by the girls. He argues that a photo allegedly depicting Janet levitating actually shows her bouncing off the bed as if it were a trampoline. Harris called the photos examples of common "gymnastics" and said, "It's worth remembering that Janet was a school sports champion!"

Nickell pointed out that a tape recorder malfunction that Grosse attributed to supernatural activity and which SPR president David Fontana described as an occurrence "which appeared to defy the laws of mechanics" was a peculiar threading jam occurring with older model reel to reel tape recorders. He also said that Ed Warren was "notorious for exaggerating and even making up incidents in such cases, often transforming a 'haunting' case into one of 'demonic possession.'"

In 2015, Deborah Hyde commented that there was no solid evidence for the Enfield poltergeist: "The first thing to note is that the occurrences didn't happen under controlled circumstances. People frequently see what they expect to see, their senses being organised and shaped by their prior experiences and beliefs."

Response to claims
Skeptics have argued that the alleged poltergeist voice that originated from Janet was produced by false vocal cords above the larynx and had the phraseology and vocabulary of a child. In a television interview for BBC Scotland, Janet was observed to gain attention by waving her hand, and then putting her hand in front of her mouth while a claimed "disembodied" voice was heard. During the interview both girls were asked the question, "How does it feel to be haunted by a poltergeist?" Janet replied, "It's not haunted," and Margaret, in a hushed tone, interrupted, "Shut up". These factors have been regarded by skeptics as evidence against the case.

As a "magician experienced in the dynamics of trickery", Nickell examined Playfair's account as well as contemporary press clippings. He noted that the supposed poltergeist "tended to act only when it was not being watched" and concluded that the incidents were best explained as children's pranks.

Although Grosse made tape recordings of Janet and believed no trickery was involved, the magician Bob Couttie said, "He made some of the recordings available to me and, having listened to them very carefully, I came to the conclusion that there was nothing in what I had heard that was beyond the capabilities of an imaginative teenager."
All of the recordings have been catalogued and digitalised by the Society for Psychical Research and a book of their content was produced by Dr Melvyn Willin in 2019. (The Enfield Poltergeist Tapes: White Crow.)

A 2016 article by psychology professor Chris French in Time Out magazine described five reasons why he believed the case to have been a hoax. His reasons are:
 The two sisters involved admitting hoaxing some of the activity
 The photo of Janet levitating above her bed could just as easily be explained as Janet jumping
 The "spirit" of an old man who supposedly possessed Janet took a great deal of interest in menstruation
 Eyewitnesses are notoriously unreliable
 Other schoolgirl pranks before and after have gotten out of hand

In popular culture
 On 26 December 1978, BBC Radio 4 broadcast the documentary The Enfield Poltergeist by BBC reporter Rosalind (Roz) Morris. Morris visited the Hodgson family on numerous occasions to make this documentary.
 In 1992 the BBC aired a controversial mockumentary titled Ghostwatch written by Stephen Volk and based on the Enfield poltergeist.
 In March 2007 Channel 4 aired a documentary about the Enfield poltergeist titled Interview with a Poltergeist.
 The Enfield poltergeist has been featured in episodes of ITV series Strange but True? and Extreme Ghost Stories.
 The Enfield poltergeist was the subject of the 2015 Sky Living television series The Enfield Haunting, which was broadcast from 4–17 May 2015.
 The 2016 film The Conjuring 2 is based on Ed and Lorraine Warren's investigation of the case.
 In 2018 the BBC Radio 4 programme The Reunion presented by Sue MacGregor, revisited the case, with interviews with witnesses Morris, Richard Grosse and Graham Morris.

References

Further reading
 Couttie, Bob (1988). Forbidden Knowledge: The Paranormal Paradox. Lutterworth Press. 
 Morris, Rosalind (presenter); Thompson, Sally (producer) (26 December 1978). The Enfield Poltergeist. BBC. BBC Radio 4. Retrieved 15 April 2018. Contemporaneous radio documentary featuring eyewitness contributions and recordings made at the house.
 Nickell, Joe (2012). The Science of Ghosts: Searching for Spirits of the Dead. Prometheus Books. 
 Playfair, Guy Lyon (1980). This House Is Haunted: The True Story of a Poltergeist Stein and Day. 
 Willin, Melvyn (2019). The Enfield Poltergeist Tapes White Crow.

External links
 BBC Radio 5 Live interview with photographer Graham Morris
 The Enfield Poltergeist Nationwide Special
 The Original Enfield Poltergeist Recordings

Enfield, London
1977 hoaxes
1977 in London
1978 in London
1979 in London
August 1977 events in the United Kingdom
English ghosts
History of the London Borough of Enfield
Paranormal hoaxes